Tuberoid can refer to:

 A trade name of the drug Ethionamide
 In some plants, an underground storage organ formed by the swelling of a root